This is a list of the squads which took part at the 1970 African Cup of Nations. The Sudan national football team won the 1970 tournament.

Cameroon
Coach: Raymond Fobété

 some modern sources report that Dominique Colonna was the head coach but Fobété was given this role in July 1969.
Cameroon also attempted to call up Joseph Yegba Maya of Olympique Marseille to the squad, but Marseille's demands for financial compensation were too high.

Congo DR

Coach: André Mori

Egypt

Coach:Saleh El Wahsh

Ethiopia

Coach:Adam Alemu and Tsehaye Bahre

Ghana

Coach:  Karl-Heinz Marotzke

Guinea

Coach: Naby Camara

Côte d'Ivoire
Coach:Peter Schnittger

Sudan
Coach:  Abdel-Fattah Hamad Abu-Zeid (1933)

References

External links

Squads
Africa Cup of Nations squads